Hostage International, formerly Hostage UK,  is a charity which aims to support the families of hostages and former hostages by providing emotional and practical care both during and after kidnap. Hostage International primarily assists individuals affected by a kidnap or illegal detention outside their home country.

Origins
Hostage International was the brain child of Terry Waite, the humanitarian author and former hostage of the Islamic Jihad Organisation and Carlo Laurenzi. Terry had a personal and very public kidnapping in Lebanon and was held for five years. Carlo, whilst head of the NGO, Prisoners Abroad, became acutely aware of the lack of provision for families of detainees and the absence of help for returnees. In 2003 Terry and Carlo met for the first time and agreed to establish a new and independent entity to support families of kidnap victims. Having put together a shadow board of trustees and supporters, Hostage UK was officially launched in the Palace of Westminster in 2004. In 2014 Hostage UK’s work was recognised by the UK government when the then director Rachel Briggs was appointed an OBE in recognition of the charity's work.

Goals and aims
Hostage International has three primary aims:

1.     To provide emotional and practical support to hostages and their families during and after a kidnap incident and to facilitate their access to specialist services;

2.     To promote best practice in hostage and family support by employers and governments through our education programme; and

3.     To ensure the needs of hostages and their families are considered in the development of relevant private and public policy.

While the organisation does not endorse the payment of ransoms, it takes a non-judgemental approach to those families that do chose to take this option.
In addition to the production of reports and guides, Hostage International occasionally makes public statements regarding issues which affect hostages and their families, such as their 2013 criticism of Facebook for allowing beheading videos on the social network.

High profile cases
In operation since 2004,  Hostage International has dealt with some high-profile cases including those of David Haines and Peter Moore. David Haines’ family asked well-wishers to donate to the charity instead of sending flowers.

Many former hostages and family members of hostages work with the charity. These include Phil Bigley, the brother of murdered former hostage Kenneth Bigley,  former hostages Judith Tebbutt, Peter Rudge
 and Ana Diamond.

References

External links
 

Charities based in the United Kingdom
Organizations established in 2004